Li Shenglin (born November 1946) is a Chinese politician. He has, since 2013, served as the Chair of the Financial and Economic Affairs Committee of the National People's Congress. He was the Minister of Transport from December 2005 to July 2012.

Biography
Born in Nantong, Jiangsu Province, Li graduated from the department of agricultural mechanics of the Zhejiang Institute of Agricultural Mechanics. He started working in August 1970, and joined the Communist Party of China (CPC) in June 1973.

His former posts include vice secretary general of the Tianjin municipal government, director and vice party chief of the Tianjin Textile Industry Bureau and director of the Tianjin Planning Commission. In October 1991, he became the vice mayor of Tianjin. He was elected the vice secretary of the CPC Tianjin committee, while still holding the post of vice mayor. From May 1998 to December 2002, he was the mayor and vice party chief of Tianjin. From March 2003 to December 2005, he served as vice minister of the National Development and Reform Commission. In December 2005, he became the Minister of Communications (later Ministry of Transport). He was appointed to his post as Minister of Transport in March 2008.  He was removed from that post in July 2012 and was succeeded by Yang Chuantang.

He has been a member of the 15th, 16th and 17th Central Committees of the Communist Party of China.

References

External links
 Li Shenglin's profile at xinhuanet.com
 Li Shenglin's profile at Ministry of Transport of PRC official website

|-

Living people
1946 births
People's Republic of China politicians from Jiangsu
Politicians from Nantong
Political office-holders in Tianjin
Chinese Communist Party politicians from Jiangsu
Ministers of Transport of the People's Republic of China